Dicerca divaricata, also known as the flatheaded hardwood borer, is a species of black coloured beetle from subfamily Chrysochroinae found in North America. The species is known for feeding on various maples such as Acer saccharum and Acer rubrum as well as Ulmus americana and Cercis species. The species fly in May and June.

References

Buprestidae
Beetles of North America
Beetles described in 1823
Taxa named by Thomas Say